I. flavescens may refer to:

 Iresine flavescens, a tropical plant
 Iris flavescens, a plant with pale yellow flowers
 Isoperla flavescens, a perlodid stonefly